Rise and Shine is a studio album by the rock band The Bears, released in 1988.

It was digitally recorded and mixed at Royal Recorders in Lake Geneva, Wisconsin, in November and December 1987.  It was mastered at Sterling Sound, in New York City, by Ted Jensen.

Critical reception
The album received generally positive reviews, although most critics preferred the Bears' first record. The Sun-Sentinel wrote that "Rise and Shine has a much harder instrumental edge than The Bears ... Belew's guitar stands up and roars on the dance-groove running through 'Rabbit Manor,' and on 'Complicated Potatoes,' a lyrically silly song with unexpectedly vicious guitar riffs." The Chicago Tribune argued that the band traded "bouncy good humor for serious concerns and simple upbeat melodies for a more angular, oblique approach."

Track listing 

 "Aches and Pains"
 "Save Me"
 "Robobo's Beef"
 "Not Worlds Apart"
 "Nobody's Fool"
 "Highway 2"
 "Little Blue River"
 "Rabbit Manor"
 "Holy Mack"
 "Complicated Potatoes"
 "You Can Buy Friends"
 "The Best Laid Plans"
 "Old Fat Cadillac"
 "Girl With Clouds"

Personnel 
The Bears
Adrian Belew - guitar, vocals
Rob Fetters - guitar, vocals
Bob Nyswonger - bass
Chris Arduser - drums

References

1988 albums
Albums produced by Adrian Belew
The Bears (band) albums